The Millionaire Next Door: The Surprising Secrets of America's Wealthy is a 1996 book by Thomas J. Stanley and William D. Danko.  The book is a compilation of research done by the two authors in the profiles of American millionaires.

The authors compare the behaviour of those they call "UAWs" (Under Accumulators of Wealth) and those who are "PAWs" (Prodigious Accumulators of Wealth). Their findings, that millionaires are disproportionately clustered in middle-class and blue-collar neighborhoods and not in more affluent or white-collar communities, came as a surprise to the authors who anticipated the contrary. Stanley and Danko's book explains why, noting that high-income white-collar professionals are more likely to devote their income to luxury goods or status items, thus neglecting savings and investments.

UAWs versus PAWs
Under Accumulator of Wealth (UAW) is a name coined by the authors used to represent individuals who have a low net wealth compared to their income. A doctor earning $250,000 per year could be considered an "Under Accumulator of Wealth" if their net worth is low relative to lifetime earnings. Take for example a 50-year-old doctor earning $250,000. According to the authors' formula he should be saving 10% yearly and should have about $1.25 million in net worth (50*250,000*10%).  If their net worth is lower, they are an "Under Accumulator". The UAW style is based more on consumption of income rather than on the method of saving income.

A Prodigious Accumulator of Wealth (PAW) is the reciprocal of the more common UAW, accumulating usually well over one tenth of the product of the individual's age and their realized pretax income.

The authors define an Average Accumulator of Wealth (AAW) as having a net worth equal to one-tenth their age multiplied by their current annual income from all sources. E.g., a 50-year-old person who over the past twelve months earned employment income of $45,000 and investment income of $5,000 should have an expected net worth of $250,000. An "Under Accumulator of Wealth (UAW)" would have half that amount, and a "Prodigious Accumulator of Wealth (PAW)" would have two times.  This metric has been criticized since, for example, a 20-year-old making $50k a year should have a net worth of $100k to be considered an "average accumulator of wealth".  That makes little sense since it would take a new graduate years of strong savings and investments to accumulate that amount.  Critics further argue that formula fails to take into account compounding interest; younger people up to age 45 or so will generally have much less as a percentage of income than older wealth accumulators due to compounded growth.

Most of the millionaire households that they profiled did not have the extravagant lifestyles that most people would assume. This finding is backed up by surveys indicating how little these millionaire households have spent on such things as cars, watches, clothing, and other luxury products/services. Most importantly, the book gives a list of reasons for why these people managed to accumulate so much wealth (the top one being that "They live below  their means"). The authors make a distinction between the 'Balance Sheet Affluent' (those with actual wealth, or high-net-worth) and the 'Income Affluent' (those with a high income, but little actual wealth, or low net-worth).

Main points

Spend less than you earn
Anyone who spends more than they earn will fail to increase their net worth.

Avoid buying status objects or leading a status lifestyle
Buying or leasing brand-new, expensive imported vehicles is poor value. 
Buying status objects such as branded consumer goods is a never-ending cycle of depreciating assets. Even when you get a good deal on premium items, if you choose to replace them frequently, the older items hold no value and have become a sunk cost.
Living in a status neighbourhood is not only poor value, but you will feel the need to keep buying status objects to keep up with your neighbours, who are mostly UAWs. 
The authors make the point that Hyperconsumers must realize more income to afford luxury items and become more vulnerable to inflation and income tax.

PAWs are willing to take financial risk if it is worth the reward
PAWs are not misers who put every penny under their mattress. They invest their money for good returns, and will consider riskier investments if they're worth the reward. Many put money not only in the stock market, but invest in private businesses and venture capital.

Family and Generational Wealth
The authors also make the observation that UAWs tend to have children who require an influx of their parents' money in order to afford the lifestyle that they expect for themselves, and that they are less likely to have been taught about money, budgeting and investing by their parents.

The authors talked about the seven most common traits that showed up among those that have accumulated wealth. Those common traits are the following; high income, low expenses, frugal, wealthy, breaking even (Spartan), spender, broke, and breaking even (Lavish).

On generational wealth the authors stressed the following: the first generation to have arrived in America usually works hard, saves prodigiously, owns a small business, lives in or near that business, and passes on his wealth to his kids frugally. The next group usually works in their parent's business, but may move on. They tend to spend more lavishly and save less. The next or 3rd generation, may have sold the business already and may have already spent all the accumulated wealth. Finally the 4th generation is not hard Working at all, spends crazily and has little. Many are literally broke and nothing like their great grand parents. This is known as Generational Wealth Destruction, and is a main tenet in the authors work.

Spending tomorrow's cash today
The most prominent idea shared by UAWs and American society in general is "spending tomorrow's cash today". This is the leading cause of debt and a lack of net worth in the UAW category. This contradicts the common belief of a PAW: "save today's cash for tomorrow".  Many UAWs do plan, under certain conditions (such as a rise in income), to use investment strategies to accumulate wealth; however, most don't actually use investment strategies to accumulate wealth once the initial conditions are met. For example, Under Accumulators of Wealth will promise to start investing once they have earned ten percent more in annual income. Unfortunately when most receive that extra ten percent of income, there isn't an investment made. These claims and ideas usually branch off an initial belief that a lack of wealth can simply be solved by an increase in income. Even among those that do invest money, most invest only because they have an excess of income. Between 2001 and 2004, the median family income dropped 2.3% and in response, the percentage of families who owned investment stocks fell by 3.3% showing that investments are only made in times of excess.

"Better Than" theory
The "Better Than" theory is one of the main reasons many UAWs don't hold true to their promise to invest after a rise in income. The theory is that the UAW's "necessity" for that income will also rise in response to the risen income level. Most UAWs are possessed by possessions. According to a study conducted by Yale and stated in The Millionaire Next Door, individuals measure the level of their success through comparison to nearest neighbors and/or closest relatives. Therefore, as the level of income rises, so will their desire to outperform those that they compare themselves to.

"Better Off" theory
In addition to the "Better Than" theory, there is a "Better Off" theory. This theory suggests that those UAWs who grow up in a poor family and land a high-income career have a tendency to feel the need to be "better off" than their parents. To a UAW, "better off" implies a larger house, a respectable degree, a foreign luxury car, a boat, and a club membership. A hypothetical example is provided in The Millionaire Next Door to explain this concept. Teddy Friend is a typical UAW that grew up in a poor family but was still exposed to a rich lifestyle at school. He saw "rich kids" and decided that one day he would be "better off" than his poor parents. Sure enough, when Mr. Friend reached a high income level, he indulged himself in possessions. He bought a large home along with a foreign luxury car. According to most UAWs, he lives a very comfortable lifestyle. He lives a very comfortable lifestyle in terms of possessions, but in terms of financial security, Mr. Friend's lifestyle is uncomfortable.

Money: a renewable resource
Another belief that UAWs have is that "money is the most easily renewable resource". This belief usually is another leading cause for UAW's consumption and investment habits. Money is more easily spent now than it is saved. In America it is easier to generate a high income than it is to accumulate wealth.

Spending habits
When it comes to spending habits, UAWs are everything but frugal.  A typical UAW tends to live in luxury, style, and above all, comfort.  Not all UAWs fit these characteristics.  A $50,000-a-year janitor can be more of a PAW than a $700,000-a-year doctor.  The spending habits that UAWs have are a direct effect of the “Better Than” theory.

Million dollar choices
Some of the financial choices that UAWs make are considered to be “million dollar choices” because if the choice hadn't been made, the UAW would have in excess of a million dollars.  One example of a million dollar choice is to smoke.  Smokers and drinkers tend to be UAWs because instead of building net worth, they spend their income to purchase alcohol or cigarettes.  Another hypothetical example given in The Millionaire Next Door explains how a small purchase of cigarettes over a long period of time can accumulate a large sum of money.   Mr. Friend's poor parents were smokers and drinkers.  They smoked at least three packs of cigarettes a day during the week.  Three packs a day over 46 years translated into a sum of money that exceeded the value of their home by $33,000. Even more extraordinary, if the Friends had invested and reinvested that money over a 46-year period, the portfolio would have exceeded $2 million.  The value of a small amount of money over a long period of time is amazing.  A UAW makes choices that, although financially insignificant at the present value, have a very significant future value.  Choices such as drinking two cases of beer a week, smoking several packs of cigarettes a day, and buying large amounts of unnecessary food and objects are some examples of typical UAW choices.  These choices are not necessarily large financial purchases right now, but over a long period of time, the opportunity cost of that money is very expensive.

Car shopping habits
According to the authors, a common UAW drives a current model car, purchased new, and may have financed it on credit. PAWs rarely purchase new model cars and are less likely to own foreign or luxury vehicles. An example from the book details a UAW that spent roughly 60 hours researching, negotiating and purchasing a new car.  In the end, while the car was purchased "near dealer cost," in the long run the UAW's time and money could have been more efficiently spent creating wealth rather than collecting possessions notorious for depreciating in value. The authors contrast the story with a PAW who decided that the pride of owning a brand new car wasn't worth the $20,000 price difference.

Investing strategies
The difference between UAWs and PAWs is wealth.  Wealth is usually obtained through investment strategies that maximize unrealized (nontaxable) income and minimizes realized (taxable) income. UAWs tend to spend more time on purchasing a car than on looking at appreciating investments. Appreciating investments such as a 401k or an Individual Retirement Account (IRA) constitute tax-deferred growth and produce an unrealized income for the individual holder.  Some UAWs do hold a 401k or an IRA but with a low portfolio value.  UAWs usually have the belief that in order to comply with the “Better Than” or “Better Off” theories, they need to maximize realized income.  Maximized realized income minimizes unrealized income, increases taxes paid, and produces low portfolio values.  Certainly there are some UAWs that invest in the stock market and are very active traders, but most don't.  Active traders move from stock to stock to try to maximize capital gains on investments based on daily fluctuations of the stock market.  This investment strategy is very risky, but has potential for some enormous capital gains.  UAWs also are more prone to being swindled out of money from cold callers.  Cold callers, usually brokers who in fact know very little about the stock market, target high income earning families and persuade them into purchasing investments with them. Doctors and lawyers are especially susceptible. A vulnerability to cold callers can subject individuals to lose trust in the stock market and eventually become a UAW. Then there are UAWs that have relatively low risk tolerance for investments. Twenty percent of UAWs keep most of their cash in cash/near cash accounts (investment accounts such as a bank accounts that have low interest rates, high liquidity, and are federally insured) so that they can have quick access to cash when consumption habits rise. Then there are some UAWs who have considerable knowledge of the specific market of a company or type of investment, but do not utilize that knowledge to their advantage.  The Millionaire Next Door uses Mr. Willis as an example.  He is a six-figure, very successful executive for Walmart.  He has been employed there for 10 years, during which the company has been explosively growing.  Stock prices have shot up in this 10-year period of time.  During this enormous growth period, Mr. Willis bought zero shares of the company he worked for, although he had firsthand knowledge of its success. A characteristic that determines if the individual is a UAW is their belief about investing.  A UAW will usually state the following about investing: “it’s hopeless,” or “I never have the time needed to make it pay off,” or “we have never made so much… but the more we earn, the less we seem to accumulate.”  Other remarks might include, “Our careers take up all of our time,” or “I don’t have 20 hours a week to fool around with my money”. A UAW does not spend a considerable amount of time evaluating their investment strategies.  On average, they'll invest only 4.6 hours a month evaluating their investment portfolios.  This is about 83% less than the amount of time a PAW allocates to financial planning. Minimal time dedicated to financial planning is a leading indicator of a UAW.

Educational and career choices
Although UAWs exist in all career fields and have obtained different levels of education, some professions are more likely to lead to a UAW lifestyle. Doctors, physicians, lawyers, and dentists are among the top professions with a high UAW concentration of individuals.  The individuals in these professions are twice as likely to be a UAW than a PAW. There are two reasons for these findings.  First, because these professions require advanced degrees, individuals get a delayed start in the accumulation race.  Most of the income during these educational pursuits is used to fund tuition, housing, and student loans rather than investment.  The second reason is that American society has prescribed a lifestyle to these professions.   Doctors are expected to live in an upscale neighborhood with multiple cars, a boat, and other luxury items.  Their lives become a high consumption lifestyle to fulfill the “Better Than” theory.

Correlation between income and wealth
With doctors having a high propensity to be a UAW as evidence, there is an indirect relationship between the level of income an individual earns and the net wealth that one accumulates.  Doctors have a reasonably high level of income; therefore, it is more likely that doctors have relatively low amounts of net worth.  The same holds true for those that have lower levels of income.  They are more likely to accumulate more in relation to their level of income. Of course, there are those who are an exception to the rule on both sides of the spectrum.  Mr. Friend's parents were poor, but they lived a high consumption lifestyle leading them to be UAWs.

Children of UAWs
When children are brought up in a high consumption, UAW lifestyle, they are more likely to become UAWs themselves.  More often than not, the children of high income UAWs become more devout believers in the UAW system than their parents.  The children grow accustomed to extreme luxury and believe that they too must possess the same luxury as their parents, even if their income is much less.  It is an extreme manifestation of the “Better Off” theory.  On the other hand, PAWs may also produce UAW offspring.  If the Friends had invested the money they had been consuming, they would have been considered PAWs; however, the standard of living that their son, Mr. Friend, grew up in would have been diminished.  Mr. Friend would have felt an even higher desire to be “better off” than his parents were.  He may still have been a UAW regardless of whether his parents were UAWs or PAWs.

Economic Outpatient Care
Economic Outpatient Care (EOC) is a term used to express when an affluent parent provides money to an adult child.  Besides offspring observations resulting in UAW children, EOC is a contributing factor to the passing on of the UAW belief.  Offspring who receive EOC have 98% of the annual income compared to their counterparts who are not recipients of EOC.  In comparison, they also have 57% of the net worth. EOC gives recipients a false sense of financial security.  For this reason they purchase homes in upscale neighborhoods that exceed the recommended value according to their incomes.  Thirty percent of American families live in homes valued at $300,000, yet only earn an annual income of $60,000. These homes then demand nice cars for the driveway, nice furniture for the living room, and a nice plasma TV to complement the furniture.  These offspring also purchase and consume the EOC rather than invest it.  If a dose of EOC is given on a regular basis, the EOC can actually be absorbed into the individual's perceived annual income.  Expenditures are then calculated with the anticipation of a regularly scheduled dose of EOC.

America: the ultimate UAW
The average American is a UAW, with an annual income of $32,000, a total net worth of $36,000, and a realized income value that is about 90% of their total net worth. The government draws the poverty line based on income, and society determines a family's well-being based on their level of earned income.  Income is a poor indicator of well-being.  On the other hand, wealth is a good indicator of the financial independency or financial dependency of individuals.  Unfortunately society has an almost unlimited number of ways to consume income and limited ways to save income; therefore, individuals are more prone to spend than save.  That eventually results in an adoption of a UAW lifestyle.

Criticism
Nassim Nicholas Taleb criticised the premise of the book on the basis of two instances of survivorship bias: that there is no mention of the accumulators who have accumulated underperforming assets, and that the United States had just gone through the greatest bull market in its history at the time of the book's publication. He suggested that the authors should lower the net worth of the observed millionaires to compensate for the effect of the unobserved losers, and to consider the fate of accumulators following prolonged periods of recession such as in 1982 or 1935.

Related publications
 Marketing to the Affluent (1988)
 Selling to the Affluent (1991)
 Networking with the Affluent (1993)
 The Millionaire Next Door (1996, 2010)
 The Millionaire Mind (2000)
 Millionaire Women Next Door (2004)
 Stop Acting Rich (2009)

See also
 FIRE movement

References

External links
  Millionaire Next Door author, Thomas J Stanely, official website and blog
 Millionaire Next Door synopsis
 First chapter
 Review of The Millionaire Next Door
 Review of The Millionaire Mind, Thomas J Stanley's other book]
 UAW/PAW Net Worth Calculator

1996 non-fiction books
Finance books